This is a list of Croatia national football team players. Most of the appearances were made since the country became independent from Yugoslavia in 1990, but international games were also played in the early 1940s and a one-off match was played in 1956. Luka Modrić made the most appearances for the national team with 162, making him one of the ten Croatian players with 100 or more caps. Davor Šuker, who was the top goalscorer at the 1998 FIFA World Cup, is by far the top goalscorer in the history of the Croatian team, with 45 goals.

Players
This list is about Croatia national football team players with at least 20 appearances. For a list of all national team players with a Wikipedia article, see the Croatia international footballers category. For the current national team squad, see Croatia national football team#Current squad.

Appearances and goals are composed of FIFA World Cup and UEFA European Championship and each competition's required qualification matches, as well as the UEFA Nations League and international friendlies. Players are listed by number of caps, then by goals scored. If they are still tied the players are listed alphabetically. Statistics correct as of 17 December 2022 and the 2022 FIFA World Cup match against Morocco.

Captains
Captaincies are composed of FIFA World Cup and UEFA European Championship and each competition's required qualification matches, as well as international friendlies. Players are listed by number of appearances as captain, then by chronological order of first captaincy. Only matches player started as a captain are counted. Statistics correct as of 17 December 2022 and the 2022 FIFA World Cup match against Morocco.

See also
List of men's footballers with 100 or more international caps

Notes

References

External links
Croatian Football Federation official website
List of players by number of appearances at hrnogomet.com
List of captains at hrnogomet.com

 
Association football player non-biographical articles